Rybachuk  is a surname of Ukrainian origin. It is a patronymic derivation  from surname/nickname Rybak, the latter literally meaning "fisherman".

Notable people with this surname include:

Ada Rybachuk (1931-2010),  Ukraine/Soviet muralist, painter, sculptor and architect 
Oleh Rybachuk,  Ukrainian politician

See also
 

Ukrainian-language surnames
Occupational surnames
Patronymic surnames